Tryggvason may refer to:

 Olaf Tryggvason (died 1000)
 Bjarni Tryggvason (born 1945), Icelandic-born Canadian engineer and a former NRC/CSA astronaut
 Gretar Tryggvason (born 1956), Professor and Head of the Mechanical Engineering Department at the Worcester Polytechnic Institute

See also
 14988 Tryggvason (1997 UA7), a Main-belt Asteroid discovered in 1997
 HNoMS Olav Tryggvason, built for the Royal Norwegian Navy by the naval shipyard at Horten in the early 1930s

Icelandic-language surnames